Chojna may refer to the following places:
Chojna, Międzychód County in Greater Poland Voivodeship (west-central Poland)
Chojna, Wągrowiec County in Greater Poland Voivodeship (west-central Poland)
Chojna in West Pomeranian Voivodeship (north-west Poland)
Chojna, Lubusz Voivodeship (west Poland)
Chojna, Gmina Kartuzy in Pomeranian Voivodeship (north Poland)
Chojna, Gmina Sulęczyno in Pomeranian Voivodeship (north Poland)